KK Sloboda may refer to the following basketball teams:

Bosnia and Herzegovina
 KK Sloboda Tuzla, based in Tuzla
 KK Sloboda 1973, based in Novi Grad

Serbia
 KK Sloboda Užice, based in Užice (1950–present)
 KK Sloboda Novi Sad, based in Novi Sad